

Sponsorship

Club

Coaching staff
{|class="wikitable"
|-
!Position
!Staff
|-
|Manager||
|-
|rowspan="4"|Assistant Manager||U Myo Win
|-
|
|-
|
|-
|
|-
|Goalkeeper Coach||
|-
|Fitness Coach||
|-

Other information

|-

First-team squad

Transfers

In:

Out:

References
 Ayeyawady United FC

External links
 
 First Eleven Journal in Burmese
 Soccer Myanmar in Burmese
 Delta Utdta United FC

Myanmar National League